YPFL may refer to:
 Yorke Peninsula Football League
 TRNAMet cytidine acetyltransferase, an enzyme